Vinovich is a surname. Notable people with the surname include:

Bill Vinovich (born 1960), American football official and basketball referee
Steve Vinovich (born 1945), American actor